Autosticha pelodes, the autosticha gelechid moth, is a moth of the family Autostichidae. It was first described by Edward Meyrick in 1883. It is found in the southern Pacific, including Hawaii and French Polynesia, Java, Sulawesi, the New Hebrides, Samoa, the Austral Islands and the Marquesas. It has been dispersed by humans.

The larvae feed on decaying vegetable matter. The larvae have been found beneath dead leaf sheaths of sugarcane, in fibrous material at the bases of palm fronds, in old Ipomoea capsules and in dead twigs and sticks of Araucaria, Lantana and Ricinus species. Full-grown larvae are about 20 mm long.

The pupa is formed in a slight cocoon of white silk where the larva has lived. It is about 7 mm long. The pupal period is 13–15 days.

References

External links

Moths described in 1883
Autosticha
Moths of Oceania
Moths of Indonesia